Igor Moiseyevich Irtenyev (born 25 May 1947, Moscow) is a Russian poet.

Biography
He is a member of PEN Russia. In 2011, he emigrated to Israel because, as he said "I just can't bear the idea of watching [Vladimir] Putin on television every day for the next 12 years". However, he returned to Russia after spending two years in Israel.

References

External links
 
 Игорь Иртеньев на сайте «Грани-ТВ»
 Кристина Витц.  Ирония как основной прием Игоря Иртеньева

Russian male poets
Living people
1947 births
Writers from Moscow
20th-century Russian poets
20th-century pseudonymous writers